Nijisanji (Japanese: にじさんじ) is a virtual YouTuber agency owned by AnyColor Inc. (formerly  Ichikara Inc., changed 17 May 2021) The agency was founded in 2018 with the purpose of promoting the use of Live2D models and streaming as opposed to the 3D and clips format popularized by Kizuna AI. Notable domestic Nijisanji members include Tsukino Mito, Higuchi Kaede, Kuzuha, Kanae, Sasaki Saku, Honma Himawari, Pomu Rainpuff, and Hyakumantenbara Salome.

History

2018
In the beginning of 2018, Ichikara Inc. founded the VTuber agency Nijisanji. Nijisanji helped popularize the use of Live2D models instead of the prior focus on 3D models as well as the shift toward livestreaming instead of edited video and clips that was the standard for VTubers like Kizuna Ai.

The name NIJISANJI (written in capital letters) was created by mixing two words in Japanese, two-dimensional  and three-dimensional . The name was created while imagining a new era of entertainment that connects the real and virtual worlds. There are two meanings implied in the NIJISANJI logo: there is the word  which means rainbow and the word  which means three o'clock. NIJISANJI's characters, or Virtual Livers, are full of colorful characters and varied personalities, which is symbolized by the rainbow in the logo.

The center piece of Nijisanji operation is their custom facial recognition app, utilizing the then-new iPhone X's native Animoji feature to capture the user facial expression to animate the Live2D avatar. The app can connect with streaming software.

On July 17, auditions were started for a Chinese branch in Shanghai and Taipei, and in cooperation with CAPSULE Inc., would recruit from each eight people for a total of sixteen Livers. The partnership with CAPSULE Inc. would end in March 2019, with Ichikara revoking its license. CAPSULE Inc. would spinoff what it maintained into VEgo. VEgo itself would go inactive by the end of March 2020.

2019
A month after the end of the original Chinese branch, in April 2019, in cooperation with bilibili, new Chinese auditions would be started. From these, the jointly operated "VirtuaReal Project" would emerge later in May.

Additionally in May, Ichikara launched its "Nijisanji Network" service where it would support other content creator and affiliated companies through the use of Nijisanji management and support resource. They also announce the first and only participants of the program being Indie VTuber Fairys-chan and Tenkai Tukasa. The service would eventually be shut down on 31 December 2019 with all its participants continuing activities on their own.

In July, auditions began for an Indonesian branch of the agency, Nijisanji ID, which would launch later in September. In November and December, auditions began for Indian and Korean branches respectively (Nijisanji IN and KR), each beginning activity in January 2020.

2020
In January 2020, Nijisanji officially opened the English version of its Twitter accounts which were followed by an English YouTube account in June. Also as part of their attempt to appeal to the English speaking audience, they rebranded their Indian branch into a broader English branch (Nijisanji EN). However, in November, the three members of Nijisanji EN were returned to their original Nijisanji IN branch, while the audition for the only English speaking talents was held in December. Nijisanji IN was eventually dissolved and all its members graduated on April 30, 2021.

In September 2020, Nijisanji created an "Aggressive Acts and Slander Countermeasure Team" to offer counselling to victims of harassment and take legal measures against perpetrators of harassment, specifically the online harassment plaguing the Japanese entertainment industry. This announcement came in the wake of Hololive VTuber Mano Aloe's retirement after only two weeks of activity due to online harassment.

In October 2020, Nijisanji privated the various Among Us streams of its member after receiving a complaint by Masuoka, a programmer who made the popular Japanese translation mod of the game. Through a tweet, Masuoka specify that the reason for his complaint was that Nijisanji was using Masuoka mod without properly crediting him. Nijisanji have since entered negotiation with him to properly credits and license his work.

On 1 December, Ichikara Inc. announced the official launch of NIJISANJI's first-wave auditions for English-speaking countries. The audition period lasted until 15 December.

2021
Nijisanji EN debuted its first wave in 16 May 2021 dubbed "LazuLight". It consisted of three female Livers: Elira Pendora, Pomu Rainpuff, and Finana Ryugu. A simultaneous commentary livestream on their English channel, hosted by Nijisanji ID members Hana Macchia and Bonnivier Pranaja was also held. It was followed by OBSYDIA in July and Ethyria in October.

On 17 May 2021, Ichikara officially renamed itself to AnyColor.

In June, Anycolor would announce a talent training initiative known as "Virtual Talent Academy". Its first auditions would be held on June 18, who would begin training starting from November. Upon completion, the graduate may be given the offer to debut in Nijisanji or freely move to other agencies to try to audition to them.

On 12 December 2021, the fourth wave of Niji EN debuted, called "Luxiem". It was made up of five male Livers: Luca Kaneshiro, Shu Yamino, Ike Eveland, Mysta Rias, and Vox Akuma. A debut program was hosted by Elira Pendora and Oliver Evans. Luxiem marked the debut of the first English-speaking male talent wave from a big VTuber agency.

2022
On February 17, Anycolor announced the merger of Nijisanji ID and Nijisanji KR into the main Nijisanji branch starting on April 15, 2022. As part of the merger, the official social media accounts of the two branches would cease operation and the ongoing audition for their latest generation for both would be cancelled.

On February 22, Noctyx, the second male wave (and fifth overall) of Nijisanji EN debuted.

On March 16, ANYCOLOR announced a new wave of three NIJISANJI Livers originally from Virtual Talent Academy, the first VTA graduates to debut directly into NIJISANJI. The new wave, "Ranunculus", began their activities on March 20.

It was later announced that Nijisanji's VTubers would collaborate with Japanese singer Yuya Tegoshi.

On June 8, ANYCOLOR publicly listed on the Tokyo Stock Exchange, opening at 4,810 yen per share. By October 18, the company was estimated to be worth over US$2.5 billion, with founder Riku Tazumi's 45% share netting him a personal wealth of roughly $1.1 billion, making him Japan's youngest billionaire.

On July 13, ANYCOLOR announced the next wave of Virtual Talent Academy graduates to debut directly into NIJISANJI. The new wave, "VOLTACTION", began their activities on July 16.

On July 24, ILUNA, the sixth wave of Nijisanji EN, debuted.

The seventh wave of Nijisanji EN, XSOLEIL, debuted on December 9.

Livers

Nijisanji members are called Virtual Livers or Livers, a portmanteau of "live streamers" and mainly stream on YouTube. Typical activities involve playing video games, singing or chatting with the audience. Over time, some Livers might get merchandise such as Nendoroid or pin-back buttons for anniversaries or special events.

Events

 Nijisanji Music Festival ～Powered by DMM music～ (2 October 2019)
 Virtual to LIVE in Ryōgoku Kokugikan (8 December 2019)
 Nijisanji Anniversary Festival 2021 Eve Festival feat. FLOW (27-28 February 2021)
 Nijisanji JAPAN TOUR 2020 "Shout in the Rainbow! Tokyo Revenge Performance" (27 February 2021) - at Tokyo Big Sight, Ariake, Tokyo. Live Concert with online stream and limited audience due to COVID restriction.
 NIJISANJI AR STAGE ”LIGHT UP TONES” (31 July - 1 August 2021)
 NIJISANJI held two concerts at YOKOHAMA Pia Arena MM in two days 30–31 October 2021:
"NIJIROCK NEXT BEAT" with 7 livers in 30 October.
"initial step in NIJISANJI" with 8 livers from First Wave in 31 October.

References

External links
 
 

 
Japanese talent agencies
Multi-channel networks
Mass media companies based in Tokyo
Japanese companies established in 2018